Mohamed Bouboud (born 11 November 1952) is a Moroccan sprinter. He competed in the men's 4 × 400 metres relay at the 1972 Summer Olympics.

References

1952 births
Living people
Athletes (track and field) at the 1972 Summer Olympics
Moroccan male sprinters
Olympic athletes of Morocco
Place of birth missing (living people)